Angus Percy Bain Richmond (10 January 1925 – 8 August 2007) was a Guyanese writer who spent most of his life in Britain.

Biography 

Richmond was born and raised in Georgetown, British Guiana (now Guyana). He won a scholarship to study at Queen's College in Georgetown and received an external BA in English, French and Latin from the University of London in 1946. He arrived in England in 1950, joined shortly after by his partner Bridget Elise Croal (1923–2013), whom he married in 1951 in London, England, where they settled. They had one daughter, Jean Evelyn Bridget (1952–2017).  

His writing, which includes novels, short stories, poetry and essays, explores racial and class-based struggles, mostly within in a Guyanese context.  

He was awarded the 1978 Casa de las Américas Prize for his debut novel, A Kind of Living.  

Richmond was close friends with fellow Guyanese writers John Agard and Grace Nichols.

Awards 
 1978: Casa de las Américas Prize for A Kind of Living
 1983: The President's Prize at the Association for Caribbean Studies Conference for the essay "The Sociology of the West Indian Novel in English" 
 1985: The Greater London Council Award for an unpublished manuscript
 1989: The Guyana Prize for Fiction for The Open Prison (shortlisted)

Bibliography 
 A Kind of Living (1978)
 The Open Prison (1988)
 Shame (1988)

See also 
 Jan Carew
 Roy Heath

References

External links 
 "The long and short of The Guyana Prize". Guyana Chronicle, 12 January 2013.
 Al Creighton, "Dissecting Roy Heath and Guyanese Literature", Stabroek News, 22 July 2018.

1925 births
2007 deaths
20th-century male writers
Alumni of Queen's College, Guyana
Alumni of the University of London
Guyanese novelists
Guyanese poets